Butzbach is a town in the Wetteraukreis district in Hessen, Germany. It is located approximately 16 km south of Gießen and 35 km north of Frankfurt am Main.

In 2007, the town hosted the 47th Hessentag state festival from 1 to 10 June.

The "Landgrafenschloss" ("landgraves' castle"), used by the United States Army until 1990, is now utilized by the city council. The so-called "Roman Way Housing" of the United States Army with more than 1000 apartments was returned to the German Government in October 2007 and since has been renovated and rented out to the public. The town's market place is enclosed by timber framing. The "Schrenzer" hill (or Heidelbeerberg, 385 m) overlooks the town and the country north of Frankfurt, called Wetterau. Another much higher mountain nearby is the Hausberg which features a look-out tower.

Boroughs of Butzbach
Butzbach consists of the boroughs Bodenrod, Butzbach (urban core), Ebersgöns, Fauerbach vor der Höhe, Griedel, Hausen-Oes, Hoch-Weisel, Kirch-Göns, Maibach, Münster, Nieder-Weisel, Ostheim, Pohl-Göns and Wiesental.

Twin towns – sister cities

Butzbach is twinned with:
 Collecchio, Italy (2012)
 Eilenburg, Germany (1990)
 Saint-Cyr-l'École, France (2008)

Notable people
Gabriel Biel (c. 1420–1495), scholastic philosopher and theologian; longtime Propst of the Brothers of the Common Life in Butzbach 
Johann Jakob Griesbach (1745–1812), biblical textual critic
Friedrich Ludwig Weidig (1791–1837), theologian, pastor and teacher; worked here 22 years as teacher and rector of the school
Lorenz Diefenbach (1806–1883), librarian, pastor, Germanist, lexicographer and writer
Friedrich Schwally (1863–1919), orientalist
Ernst Glaeser (1902–1963), writer
Peter Krick (born 1944), figure skater
Dieter Enders (born 1946), chemist and expert in the field of asymmetric synthesis
Siegfried Zielinski (born 1951), media scientist and university lecturer
Ron Gardenhire (born 1957), baseball manager

References

External links

 Official website 
 Town museum website 
 English description 

Wetteraukreis
Grand Duchy of Hesse